Anna Iljuštšenko (born 12 October 1985 in Sillamäe) is an Estonian high jumper.

Biography
She finished ninth at the 2007 Summer Universiade with a jump of 1.80 metres. She competed at the 2004 World Junior Championships (result 1.75 m), the 2006 European Championships (result 1.87 m), the 2008 Olympic Games (result 1.89 m), the 2009 European Indoor Championships (result 1.85 m), the 2009 World Championships (result 1.89 m) and the 2010 World Indoor Championships (result 1.89 m) and 2011 European Indoor Championships (result 1.89 m) without reaching the final round.  On several of these and the other occasions where she failed to reach the finals, she missed out due to countback.

She reached the final of the 2011 World Championships, finishing in 12th place with a jump of 1.89 m, and also the final of the 2010 European Championships, finishing in 11th place with a jump of 1.85 m.

Following that however, she failed to reach the final in the 2012 World Indoor Championships (result 1.88 m), the 2012 Summer Olympics (result 1.90 m), the 2012 European Championships (result 1.87 m), the 2013 World Championships (result 1.88 m) and the 2014 World Indoor Championships (result 1.88 m).

She reached the final of the 2013 European Indoor Championships, narrowly missing out on a medal and finishing in 4th place with a jump of 1.92 m.

Her personal best jump is 1.96 metres, achieved on 9 August 2011 in Viljandi, Estonia (national record). Her indoor best is 1.94, achieved on 2 February 2013 in Arnstadt, Germany (national record). Her trainer for a long time was Martin Kutman.

Competition record

References

External links
 
 
 
 

1985 births
Living people
Sportspeople from Sillamäe
Estonian female high jumpers
Athletes (track and field) at the 2008 Summer Olympics
Athletes (track and field) at the 2012 Summer Olympics
Olympic athletes of Estonia
Estonian people of Russian descent
Universiade medalists in athletics (track and field)
World Athletics Championships athletes for Estonia
Universiade bronze medalists for Estonia
Medalists at the 2011 Summer Universiade
Medalists at the 2013 Summer Universiade